Bad Schwalbach (called Langenschwalbach until 1927) is the district seat of Rheingau-Taunus-Kreis, in Hesse, Germany.

Geography

Geographic location 
Bad Schwalbach is a spa town some 20 km northwest of Wiesbaden. It lies at 289 to 465 m above sea level in the Taunus, along the small river Aar (Lahn) (a tributary of the Lahn). Over 56 percent of the municipal area is forest.

Neighbouring communities 
Bad Schwalbach borders in the north on the community of Hohenstein, in the east on the town of Taunusstein, in the south on the community of Schlangenbad, and in the west on the community of Heidenrod.

Constituent communities 
Bad Schwalbach’s Stadtteile are Adolfseck, Bad Schwalbach, Fischbach (Bad Schwalbach), Heimbach, Hettenhain, Langenseifen, Lindschied and Ramschied.

History 

Bad Schwalbach was first mentioned in a document in 1352 as Langinswalbach. The first reliable report of the mineral springs came in 1568 from the Worms doctor Tabernaemontanus, who also made  the place known in his 1581 work Neuw Wasserschatz (New Water Resources). Although Langenschwalbach was utterly destroyed in the Thirty Years' War, it was quickly rebuilt, and the healing water trade began to blossom. At first, the water would be sold by the jug or barrel throughout Europe by mail order. Only a few seekers of healing undertook the arduous journey to the Taunus.

The health resort started at the beginning of the 19th century only after the improvement of road conditions through construction.  The Aartalbahn (railway) from Wiesbaden to Langenschwalbach, finished in 1889, also contributed substantially to its founding. Many crowned heads, princes and counts then came to take the waters and visit the gaming parlours where few strict rules applied. After the end of the First World War, the nobility quickly lost importance and thus began the long, drawn-out and somewhat painful transition from a luxury spa to a public one, which only ended after the Second World War.

In a wood near Bad Schwalbach in late 1800 or early 1801, Katharina Pfeifer is said to have borne the outlaw Schinderhannes (Johannes Bückler) a child.

Politics

Town council 

The municipal election held on 26 March 2006 yielded the following results:

Mayors 
1995–2001: Günter Janisch (CDU)
2001–2007: Michael Kalhoff (CDU)
2007–2019: Martin Hußmann (FDP)
2019–incumbent: Markus Oberndörfer (SPD)

Culture and sightseeing
The Kurbahn,  which operates on the rails of the former Moortransportbahn in the spa park, provides special access to the town’s and health resort’s history. From April to October, the trains are run by the Bad Schwalbacher Kurbahn Verein e.V. on all Sundays and holidays. From Moorbadehaus Station the line leads to the Moorgruben by way of Golfhaus, Schwalbenbrunnen and Waldsee.

Bad Schwalbach's only museum was reopened in 2002 with new exhibits. Through its exhibits, it attempts to lead visitors through Bad Schwalbach’s history and its life as a health resort. Among other things, the museum includes the pharmacy museum, once displayed in private rooms. The pharmacy museum contains the oldest pharmacy in the Taunus (established in 1642), fully furnished. The museum also houses the town archive.

Also worth seeing are the seven fountains and many temples, among them the Elisabethentempel, which was endowed by Elisabeth of Austria-Hungary (Sissi) while she was staying at the spa in Langenschwalbach. It affords a good view over the town.

North of the town is found Alexander’s Rest – so called even in German – a sheltered bench which also serves as a memorial to a British spa visitor who was killed at this spot in a bicycle accident in August 1896 (he is buried at the local cemetery).

Economy and Infrastructure
The largest employer is the Schwälbchen Molkerei Jakob Berz AG (dairy).

Transport 
Bad Schwalbach lies on Bundesstraße 260, also known as the Bäderstraße (“Bath Road”), as well as Bundesstraßen 54 and 275. The nearest Autobahn interchange is on the A 66 15 km away. There is also another interchange 20 km away at Idstein on the  A 3.

Bad Schwalbach also lies on the Aartalbahn, but there has been no regular passenger service since 1986, only seasonal railway-museum tours by the Nassauische Touristikbahn. Bad Schwalbach is therefore the only Hessian district seat which is no longer served by rail. There have been efforts to have the line reactivated, yet they have all been unsuccessful so far. This line has been labelled a cultural monument and is Hesse's longest building monument – only the Roman limes, a land monument, is longer.

Education 
 Nikolaus-August-Otto-Schule (comprehensive school, roughly 1500 students)
 Wiedbachschule (primary school)
 Janusz-Korczak-Schule (school for help with learning, special education advisory and promotional centre)
 Internationale Opernakademie (professional school for opera singers)

Famous people

Sons and daughters of the town 
 Polyxena of Hesse-Rotenburg (1706–1735), Queen of Sardinia
 Charles Emmanuel, Landgrave of Hesse-Rotenburg, nephew of the above (1746–1812)
 Edmund Heusinger von Waldegg (1817–1886), railway engineer
 Otto Frickhoeffer (1892-1968) conductor and composer
 Robert Philipp Nöll von der Nahmer (1899–1986), FDP politician
 Reinhard Suhren (1916–1984), frigate captain and U-boat commander in the Second World War
 Jörg Fauser (1944–1987), journalist and writer
 Klaus-Peter Willsch (1961–    ), CDU politician
 Erol Bulut (1975–    ), former footballer and manager
 Christian Werner (1979–    ), competition cyclist

People associated with the town 
 Matthäus Merian the Elder (1593–1650), copper engraver and publisher, died in Bad Schwalbach
 Johann Heinrich Fenner von Fenneberg (1774–1849), balneotherapist
 Philipp Hoffmann (1806–1889), architect and building master
 Adolphus Busch (1839–1913), entrepreneur, died in Lindschied
 Paul Wallot (1841–1912), architect of the Reichstag building, died in Bad Schwalbach
 Friedrich Delitzsch (1850–1922), Assyriologist, also died here
 Julius Lippert (1895–1956) NSdAP Politician, Mayor of Berlin, died in Bad Schwalbach
 Bernhard Bendel (1908–1980), founder of the Catholic organization Opus Spiritus Sancti

The Realschule (Hufeisenschule) in what was then called Langenschwalbach was attended from 1846 to 1848 by Nicolaus Otto (1832–1891), the inventor born in nearby Holzhausen an der Haide who developed the Otto engine.

References

Further reading

External links 

 Bad Schwalbach 
 Museum in Bad Schwalbach 
 

Rheingau-Taunus-Kreis
Spa towns in Germany